Mahameru may refer to:

 A 3D representation of the Sri Yantra
 Mount Meru
 Semeru, a volcano in Java, Indonesia